Grey College can refer to:

 Grey College, Durham
 Grey College, Bloemfontein